Daniel Florentin Popescu (born 25 August 1993) is a Romanian professional footballer who plays as a goalkeeper.

References

External links
 
 

1993 births
Living people
Sportspeople from Târgu Jiu
Romanian footballers
Association football goalkeepers
Liga I players
Liga II players
CS Pandurii Târgu Jiu players
CSU Voința Sibiu players
SCM Râmnicu Vâlcea players
CS Minerul Motru players